Oscar Christian Gundersen (17 March 1908 – 21 February 1991) was a Norwegian politician for the Labour Party.

During his student days he was a member of Mot Dag. Gundersen graduated with the cand.jur. degree in 1931. During Gerhardsen's Second Cabinet he was appointed Minister of Justice and the Police, a post he a year into the new Torp's Cabinet. He left in 1952 and became a Supreme Court Justice the next year. In 1958 he left that position to become Norwegian ambassador to the Soviet Union, a post he held until 1961.

He was then appointed Minister of Trade and Shipping from 1962 to 1963 during the third cabinet Gerhardsen. In August 1963 the cabinet Lyng assumed office, but a fourth cabinet Gerhardsen returned to power a month later. Gundersen was now Minister of Justice and the Police again, a post he held until the fourth cabinet Gerhardsen fell in 1965. He worked as a Supreme Court Justice for the second time, from 1967 to 1977.

From 1970 to 1973 he chaired the committee that delivered the Norwegian Official Report 18/1974, about State Secretaries. The work led to a new §14 and an altered §62 in the Constitution of Norway, leading to State Secretaries being eligible for general election and establishing the role as political. Propositions about granting access for State Secretaries to parliamentary debates without the ability to vote, to which Gundersen agreed, failed.

References

1908 births
1991 deaths
Government ministers of Norway
Ministers of Trade and Shipping of Norway
Labour Party (Norway) politicians
Supreme Court of Norway justices
Ambassadors of Norway to the Soviet Union
Politicians from Trondheim
Mot Dag
Ministers of Justice of Norway